Savage is an unincorporated community and census-designated place (CDP) in Richland County, Montana, United States.

Savage was first listed as a CDP prior to the 2010 census. In previous censuses, the area was counted within the former Knife River CDP.

Demographics

History
Savage is named for H. M. Savage, supervising engineer for the U. S. Reclamation Service. For many years it was a busy shipping point for grain farmers and river-bottom beet growers. Sugar beet farms benefited with the opening of a sugar beet factory in Sidney in 1925.

Recreation
Basic services are available in the community and boating access to the Yellowstone River is nearby.

Climate
According to the Köppen Climate Classification system, Savage has a semi-arid climate, abbreviated "BSk" on climate maps.

Education
Savage Public School educates students from kindergarten through 12th grade. Savage High School's team name is the Warriors.

References

Census-designated places in Richland County, Montana
Unincorporated communities in Montana
Unincorporated communities in Richland County, Montana